Gamer Network Limited (formerly Eurogamer Network Limited) is a British mass media company based in Brighton. Founded in 1999 by Rupert and Nick Loman, it owns brands—primarily editorial websites—relating to video game journalism and other video game businesses. Its flagship website, Eurogamer, was launched alongside the company. In February 2018, Gamer Network was acquired by ReedPop.

Gamer Network also organises the EGX trade fair.

History 
Gamer Network was founded under the name Eurogamer Network in 1999 by brothers Rupert and Nick Loman. It was formed alongside the opening of its flagship website, Eurogamer, which itself launched on 4 September 1999. Nick Loman left the business in 2004 to pursue a career in medicine and "competitive BBQ".

In February 2011, Eurogamer Network acquired American publishing house Hammersuit, alongside its IndustryGamers.com and Modojo.com websites. On 1 March 2013, in line with the international expansion, Eurogamer Network announced that it had changed its name to Gamer Network. As part of the rebranding, Eurogamer Events was renamed Gamer Events, while Hammersuit also adopted the Gamer Network name. In October, Simon Maxwell was promoted from group publishing director to chief operating officer.

On 26 February 2018, it was announced that ReedPop, the division of Reed Exhibitions that organises video game exhibitions like PAX, had acquired Gamer Network. While Rupert Loman remained Gamer Network's chief executive officer, Maxwell became the company's managing director and a vice-president for ReedPop's UK operations. Loman left the company in February 2020.

ReedPop implemented a number of layoffs across many of the Gamer Network sites in September 2020. In November 2020, the remaining USgamer staff, which had been reduced from nine to four after the earlier layoffs, reported that ReedPop was shuttering the site by the end of the year.

Owned brands

Editorial websites 
  – A board game-centric website and YouTube channel launched by Gamer Network in August 2019. Its editor-in-chief is Matt Jarvis.
 Eurogamer – Gamer Network's flagship website for video game news; launched in 1999 alongside the company. The Eurogamer brand is licensed to 8 regional sub-outlets, which report in their region's language. Its editor-in-chief is Martin Robinson.
 GamesIndustry.biz – A website focused on the business aspects of the video game industry; launched under Eurogamer Network in 2002. Its editor-in-chief is James Batchelor.
 Outside Xbox – A YouTube channel focusing on Xbox game news; launched in 2012 by Eurogamer Network and Andy Farrant, Mike Channell and Jane Douglas, three editors of other Xbox-focused outlets.
Outside Xtra - A YouTube channel focusing on multi-platform (non-Xbox) news such as PlayStation, Nintendo, VR and PC; launched in 2016 by Outside Xbox and Ellen Rose and Luke Westaway, Writer and Presenter of Xbox On and Senior Editor at CNET respectively.
 Rock Paper Shotgun – A website focused on personal computer game news launched in 2007 by Kieron Gillen, Alec Meer, John Walker and Jim Rossignol; partnered with Eurogamer Network in 2010 and acquired by it in 2017. Its editor-in-chief is Katharine Castle.
 VG247 – A video game news site formed in 2008 in a partnership between Eurogamer Network and Patrick Garratt. Its editor-in-chief is Tom Orry.

Other 
 Jelly Deals – A website highlighting sales for video games; launched in 2016.

Former 
 Gamer Creative – Gamer Network's in-house creative agency; founded and headed by Josh Heaton.
 Gamer's Edition – A project that produces merchandise and special edition releases for video games; launched in 2013, its first projects were special editions for Papers, Please and a compilation of Hotline Miami and Hotline Miami 2: Wrong Number.
 Metabomb – A video game news website with emphasis on esports; launched under Gamer Network in 2013.
 USgamer (USG) – A sister site to Eurogamer helmed by American staff; launched in 2013 and shut down in 2020. After closure, the website's content was migrated to VG247.

Partnered websites

Editorial websites 
 Nintendo Life – A website focused on news and reviews of Nintendo products, including video games and software, owned and operated by Hookshot Media (formerly Nlife Media). It has sections covering the Nintendo Switch, Wii U, Wii, Nintendo 3DS, Nintendo DSi, WiiWare, DSiWare and classic titles re-released through Nintendo's Virtual Console games. It was founded in late 2005,  acquired the sites WiiWare World and Virtual Console Reviews in April 2009, and partnered with Gamer Network (then Eurogamer Network) in 2011. In 2015 the site expanded its YouTube channel to receive regular content.
 Push Square – A website focused in PlayStation game news; launched in 2012 by Nintendo Life and Sammy Barker.
 Pure Xbox – A website focused in Xbox game news; relaunched in 2020 by Nlife Media.
 Road to VR – A video game news website with emphasis on virtual reality; launched by Ben Lang in 2011 and partnered with Gamer Network in 2017.
 Time Extension – A website focused on retrogaming; launched in 2022 by Hookshot Media.
 Video Games Chronicle (VGC) – A spiritual successor to magazine Computer and Video Games; launched in partnership with Gamer Network in 2019 by a team led by Andy Robinson.

Other 
 Mod DB – A database website for video game modifications; launched in 2002 and partnered with Gamer Network in 2015.
 Indie DB – A sister site for Mod DB that covers indie games; launched by Mod DB in 2010 and partnered with Gamer Network alongside Mod DB in 2015.

References

External links 
 

1999 establishments in England
2018 mergers and acquisitions
Companies based in Brighton
Video game companies of the United Kingdom